2020 Lithuanian Football Cup  - 32nd edition of the Independent Lithuania Football Cup. The official name of this year's competition for sponsorship reasons is  Hegelmann LFF Cup .

This year's tournament was scheduled to start in April 2020. However, due to the COVID-19 pandemic, it was postponed to mid-June.

A total of 33 A Lyga, LFF I Lyga and II Lyga teams are participating. The reserve teams do not participate in the cup competition. The A Lyga teams will join the tournament from the 1/8 final stage.  With a view to shorten the competition the teams of lower divisions were not invited this year.

Match and draw calendar

Participants 
A total of 33 participants consisted of 6 A Lyga, 10 LFF I Lyga and 17 II Lyga teams.

Results

Preliminary Round I 

 The league that the team represents is indicated in brackets.
 Note: FK Aukštaitija changed the club's name to FK Ekranas.

Randomly drawn teams that advanced to Round II:

Randomly drawn I Lyga teams that advanced to 1/8 final:

Round II 
The Round II draw took place on 22 June 2020

1/8 Final 
The 1/8 Final draw took place on 2 July 2020

1/4 Final 
The 1/4 Final draw took place on 17 July 2020

1/2 Final

Final 
The final will be broadcast on TV3 channel for the first time.

See also
 2020 A Lyga
 2020 LFF I Lyga
 2020 II Lyga
 Football in Lithuania

References

External links
 Lietuvos Futbolas
 Lithuanian Football Federation

Lithuanian Football Cup seasons
2020 in Lithuanian football
Seasons in Lithuanian football
Lithuania
Lithuania
Lithuanian Football Cup